"I Adore Mi Amor" is a song by American R&B group Color Me Badd, released as the second single (third in the United Kingdom) from their debut album, C.M.B. (1991). The song peaked at number one on the US Billboard Hot 100 chart for two weeks and spent 20 weeks on the listing, finishing 1991 at number 18 on the Billboard year-end chart. Worldwide, the track entered the top 20 in Canada, the Netherlands, and New Zealand. In 1992, saxophonist Najee covered the song from the album Just an Illusion.

Track listing
US 12-inch single
 "I Adore Mi Amor" (U.S.A. mix) – 4:52
 "I Adore Mi Amor" (Round the Way mix) – 4:27
 "I Adore Mi Amor" (international mix) – 4:49
 "I Adore Mi Amor" (T.V. mix) – 4:26

Charts

Weekly charts

Year-end charts

Certifications

Release history

See also
 Hot 100 number-one hits of 1991 (United States)
 List of number-one R&B singles of 1991 (U.S.)

References

1991 singles
1991 songs
Billboard Hot 100 number-one singles
Cashbox number-one singles
Color Me Badd songs
Giant Records (Warner) singles